Love in Stereo is the debut album by English-born singer-songwriter and musician Carmen Reece. It was released on 6 August 2010 in iTunes. Her other album, Unplugged, was released on 1 September 2010, containing covers of many artists' songs.

Introduction
Carmen Reece was discovered by Mark J. Feist. Feist, signed her to his production company/Label REAL MF LTD, (independent) Mark J. Feist has sold 30 million records in his career and has produced and written for Beyoncé, Kelly Rowland & Celine Dion, To name a few.

Credits
Carmen Reece and Mark J. Feist co-wrote the entire album with the exception of Right Here & Love in Stereo (Wayne Hector, Mark J. Feist, Carmen Reece) Raindrop, Be The One &  Runnin' (Rose Marie Tan, Carmen Reece, Mark J. Feist) The album was recorded at Feist's Studio in Woodland Hills Ca. Except, Right Here which was written and recorded at Metropolis studios in London.  Reece plays all piano parts on the album, whereas Feist played all other instruments.  Feist also arranged and recorded every track. Carmen Reece performs all vocals (Background and leads).   Feist mixed; Right Here, Don't Ever Leave Me, Love in Stereo, Runnin', Be The One, and Long Goodbye. Jon Gass mixed; Bullet Through My Heart and Raindrop. There are also re-mixes of "Right Here" by: Dave Audé, Jason Nevins, DJ Escape, And Mark J. Feist. Raindrop has remixes by: Dave Audé, Mark J. Feist & Jon Gass. The album was mastered by Bernie Grundman in Hollywood, CA.

Singles
"Right Here"   was the first single, which made Billboard Chart history, Making Carmen Reece the only debut artist ever to climb from No. 12 and later No. 3 in two weeks on the Hot Top 40 Dance Airplay. It was released on 26 October 2009. It made to No. 10 in the Billboard Dance/Club Play Songs and No. 12 to No. 3 in Hot Dance Airplay.
"Raindrop" is the second single to be released on 2 June 2010. It made to the Top 40/Pop Radio in May 2010.

Track listing
All songs were produced & arranged by Mark J. Feist.

 Be The One
 Right Here
 Bullet Through My Heart
 Love in Stereo
 Runnin'
 Don't Ever Leave Me
 Raindrop (Written by Reece, Feist and Rose Marie Tan)
 Long Goodbye
 Raindrop (Mark Feist/Jon Gass Extended)
 Right Here (Dave Aude Radio)
 Bullet Through My Heart (No Intro)

References

2010 debut albums
Carmen Reece albums